The 2019 Brisbane Darts Masters, in association with Pirate Life was the second staging of the tournament by the Professional Darts Corporation, as the third entry in the 2019 World Series of Darts. The tournament featured 16 players (eight PDC players facing eight regional qualifiers) and was held at the BCEC in Brisbane, Australia from 9–10 August 2019.

Rob Cross was the defending champion, after defeating Michael van Gerwen 11–6 in the 2018 final, but lost to Damon Heta 8–7 in the final.

Damon Heta won his first televised title after defeating the defending champion Rob Cross 8–7 in the final on his birthday. Heta only become the second regional qualifier to win a World Series event after compatriot and best friend Kyle Anderson won the 2017 Auckland Darts Masters. He also became both the first ever host nation player and the first ever non-Tour Card holder to win a World Series event.

Prize money
The total prize fund was £60,000.

Qualifiers
The eight invited PDC representatives, (seeded according to the World Series Order of Merit) were:

  Peter Wright (first round)
  Rob Cross (runner-up)
  Daryl Gurney (semi-finals)
  James Wade (first round)
  Michael van Gerwen (quarter-finals)
  Gary Anderson (quarter-finals)
  Simon Whitlock (semi-finals)
  Raymond van Barneveld (quarter-finals)

The regional qualifiers were:

Draw

References

Brisbane Darts Masters
Brisbane Darts Masters
World Series of Darts
Sport in Brisbane
Brisbane Darts Masters